Kongola is the westernmost constituency of Zambezi Region of Namibia, and the largest by area. It is located near the Kwando River. The administrative centre is Kongola. As of 2020, the constituency had 5,565 registered voters.

People
Besides Kongola some of the settlements in this constituency are Chetto, Pipo, Kachenje, Nxtohei, Omega 3, Poca, Mashambo, Mwanzi, Izwi, Mulanga, Munguza, Kahunikwa, Queensland, Kakuwa, and Mitondo. Its population was 7,366 at the 2011 Census.

The area is populated by members of the Mafwe and Mashi tribes, and thus governed by two traditional authorities. A large area on the western side of the constituency falls under the Bwabwata National Park where approximately 1,900 Khwe San people reside.

Politics
The 2015 regional election was won by David Siyayo Muluti of the SWAPO Party with 1,227 votes, followed by Justings Musupi Kutembeka of the Rally for Democracy and Progress (RDP) with 495 votes. The 2020 regional election was won by Bennety Likulela Busihu, an independent candidate. He received 1,236 votes. SWAPO's Muluti came second with 538 votes, followed by Albius Silwabubi Walubita of the Popular Democratic Movement (PDM, 384 votes) and Adams Manyando Lusepani from the Independent Patriots for Change (IPC, an opposition party formed in August 2020) with 333 votes.

References 

Constituencies of Zambezi Region